KBWW (88.3 FM, "The Gospel Station") is an American radio station broadcasting a southern gospel format. Licensed to Broken Bow, Oklahoma, the station is owned by the Golden Baptist Church.

History
This station was assigned call sign KBWW on February 6, 2009.

Translators

References

External links
KBWW official website

BWW
Southern Gospel radio stations in the United States